Vijay Menon is an Indian actor, editor, director and dubbing artist in Malayalam cinema. He has acted in more than 100 films in South Indian languages. He mainly handles in character roles and supporting roles. He has won Kerala State Film Awards thrice, including Kerala State Film Award for Best Dubbing Artist twice in 2011  a Kerala State Film Award – Special Mention for Hey Jude in 2017.

Biography
He writes articles in The Indian Express about international politics. He won the Kerala State Film Award for Best Dubbing artist in 2011 and 2017 for the movies Melvilasom and Oppam respectively.

Awards and honours

Filmography

Actor

 Nidra (1981)
Kann Sivanthaal Mann Sivakkum (1983)  - Tamil
 Prem Nazirine Kanmanilla (1983)
 Rachana (1983)
 Asthi(1983)  as Dileep
 Nilavinte nattil (1984)
 Choodaatha Pookkal (1985)
 Meenamaasathile Sooryan (1986) as Chirukandan
 Anbulla Malare (1984)
 Varusham 16 (1988) - Tamil
 Isabella (1988)
 Iyer The Great (1990)
 Ananthavruthaantham (1990)
 Mukham (1990)
 Prosecution (1990)
 Utharakaandam (1991)
 Kadhanayika (1991)
 Karppooradeepam (2012)
 Sainyam (1994)
 The King (1995) as Dr. Vijay
 Boxer (1995)
 Ezhu Nilaappanthal (1997)
 Meenathil Thalikettu (1998)
 Pathram (1999)
 Agrahaaram (2001)
 Pranayaaksharangal (2001)
 Vajram (2004)
 Masanagudi Mannadiyar Speaking (2004)
 Rajamanikyam (2005) as Adv. Lal Cheriyan
 Sooryakireedam (2007)
 Thaniye (2007)
 Nadiya Kollappetta Rathri(2007)
 Pachamarathanalil (2008)
 Bhaarya Swantham Suhruthu (2009)
 Banaras (2009)
 Vairam (2009)
 Keralolsavam Mission 2009 (2009)
 Ring Tone (2010)
 Nayagan (2010)
 Violin (2011)
 The King & the Commissioner (2012) as Kishore Balakrishnan
 Father's Day (2012)
 Nidra (2012)
 Cobra (2012)
 Spirit (2012)
 Banking Hours 10 to 4 (2012)
 Caribbeans (2013) as Vijayan
 Police Maamman (2013)
 Zachariayude Garbhinikal (2013)
 Mithram (2014)
 Jamna Pyari (2015)
 Laila O Laila (2015)
 King Liar (2015) as Minister
 Salt Mango Tree (2015)
 Kattumakkan (2016)
 Pokkiri Simon (2017)
 Hey Jude (2018)
 Athiran (2019)
 Pixelia (2020)
 Grahanam (2021)
 Mahaveeryar (2022)
 1921: Puzha Muthal Puzha Vare as Aamu

Dubbing artist

Direction
 Nilavinte nattil (1986)
 Pranayaaksharangal (2001)
 Vilakkumaram (2017)

Story
 Nilavinte nattil (1986)
 Pranayaaksharangal (2001)

Dialogue
 Nilavinte nattil (1986)
 Pranayaaksharangal (2001)

Screenplay
 Nilavinte nattil(1986)
 Pranayaaksharangal (2001)
 Vilakkumaram (2017)

Editing
 Nilavinte nattil (1986)

Television career

References

External links

Indian male film actors
Male actors from Kerala
Male actors in Malayalam cinema
Kerala State Film Award winners
20th-century Indian male actors
21st-century Indian male actors
Year of birth missing (living people)
Living people
People from Ottapalam
Indian male television actors
Male actors in Malayalam television
Malayalam film directors
Malayalam screenwriters
Screenwriters from Kerala